Shoal Creek is an  stream tributary of the Spring River in southwest Missouri and southeast Kansas.  It begins in Barry County, Missouri southwest of Exeter and flows west through Newton county in Missouri before emptying into the Spring River near Riverton in Cherokee County, Kansas.

Grand Falls
South of Joplin the stream flows over Grand Falls, a large waterfall that spans the entire creek from bank to bank. In the 1890s a hydroelectric plant was built at the site but has since been abandoned.  A theatre, boat houses, a German Village and a dance pavilion were built by the falls in the early 20th century and the Missouri Pacific Railroad shuttled visitors to the site.

See also
 List of rivers of Kansas
 List of rivers of Missouri

References

Rivers of Missouri
Rivers of Kansas
Rivers of Cherokee County, Kansas
Rivers of Barry County, Missouri
Rivers of Newton County, Missouri
Rivers of Jasper County, Missouri
Waterfalls of Missouri